Stephanie Ann Davis (born 8 March 1993) is an English actress. She began her career with small roles in British television series, and in 2010, she competed in the BBC talent-search Over the Rainbow. She was then cast in the Channel 4 soap opera Hollyoaks, portraying the role of Sinead O'Connor from September 2010 to September 2019. In 2016, she was the runner-up in the seventeenth series of Celebrity Big Brother.

Career 
Davis began her career playing the role of Gretl von Trapp in the Liverpool Empire Theatre's production of The Sound of Music when she was seven years old. A year later she played Little Nell in ‘’Her Benny’’ and 2 years later aged just 10 years old she landed the title role in the theatre's production of “Annie”.

Davis' television career began with guest roles in Holby City, Doctors, Parents of the Band and the television movie The Outsiders. In 2010, Davis took part in Over the Rainbow, which was a talent show searching for an actress to play Dorothy Gale in the Andrew Lloyd Webber production of The Wizard of Oz. She advanced to the seventh episode where she was voted off following a sing-off against Stephanie Fearon.

Following her appearance in Over the Rainbow, Davis went on to be cast as Sinead O'Connor in Hollyoaks and made her on-screen debut on 1 September 2010. On 16 July 2015, it was announced Davis' contract had been terminated. Her agent confirmed that she was fired from the job because she arrived on-set "unfit for work". In May 2018, Davis announced that she would be returning to Hollyoaks as Sinead, nearly three years after her sacking.

In November 2015, Davis signed up to appear on the fifteenth series of I'm a Celebrity...Get Me Out of Here!. She had to cancel her appearance because of a potentially fatal nut allergy. In January 2016, Davis appeared on the seventeenth series of Celebrity Big Brother as a contestant, eventually finishing the series as runner-up.

On 21 February 2020, Davis released a single titled "Lights Out".

Personal life 
Davis grew up in St Helens and attended the De La Salle School in St Helens. She is the daughter of Pauline and Roy Davis and has two younger brothers, Keelan and Jordan.

Davis had a widely publicised and tumultuous relationship with reality television personality Jeremy McConnell. In January 2017, Davis gave birth to their son named Caben Albi. After their relationship ended, McConnell was found guilty of assaulting Davis; he received a 20-week suspended sentence and was ordered to carry out 200 hours of community service, and was later jailed for triggering his suspended sentence by failing to attend his community service appointments. In 2018, Davis had a relationship with her Hollyoaks colleague Owen Warner.

Davis has spoken openly about her mental health issues and depression. She has stated that she is in recovery and spent time in rehab. In November 2019, Davis revealed that she was diagnosed with high-functioning autism. In 2019, Davis had a mental health relapse and attempted suicide. She later discussed the incident when she started vlogging to help others.

Filmography

Awards and nominations

References

External links 
 

1993 births
Actresses from Liverpool
Big Brother (British TV series) contestants
English soap opera actresses
English television actresses
Living people
Actors with autism